Ogechi Adeola is a Nigerian business studies academic. She is the associate dean of business administration at the University of the People and associate professor of marketing at the Lagos Business School.

Life 
Adeola earned a law degree from the University of Nigeria. She completed an MBA and Doctor of Business Administration at Manchester Business School.

Adeola is an associate professor of marketing and heads the department of operations, marketing, and information systems at Lagos Business School. She is the associate dean of business administration at University of the People. In February 2021, Adeola was named the independent non-executive director of Cornerstone Insurance Plc.

Adeola is a fellow of the Institute of Strategic Management, Nigeria and the .Adeola is also an author and also an associate professor of marketing at the Lagos business school.In 2016 and 2017, Adeola ogechi published academic papers in scholarly journals where she won Best Paper Awards at international conferences. She’s also the founder of Business Tutelage for women Empowerment in Africa initiative.

Selected works

References

External links 

 
 
 

Living people
Year of birth missing (living people)
Place of birth missing (living people)
University of Nigeria alumni
Alumni of the Manchester Business School
Academic staff of Pan-Atlantic University
University of the People faculty
Nigerian women academics
21st-century Nigerian women writers
21st-century Nigerian businesswomen
21st-century Nigerian businesspeople